Hermes Lima, (22 December 1902 – 10 October 1978) was Brazilian politician who was the Prime Minister of Brazil, jurist, and winner of the 1975 Prêmio Machado de Assis.

Political career 
He originally became an elected federal deputy of the National Democratic Union in 1945, but two years later co-founded and joined the Brazilian Socialist Party. Under João Goulart he served as Labour Minister and later as Prime Minister (from 18 September 1962 until 23 January 1963). He would go on to serve in the Brazilian Supreme Court before being forced into retirement by the military dictatorship in 1969.

Notes

References 

|-

|-

|-

|-

|-

Brazilian Socialist Party politicians
Prime Ministers of Brazil
Government ministers of Brazil
Supreme Federal Court of Brazil justices
Members of the Brazilian Academy of Letters
Brazilian essayists
1902 births
1978 deaths
20th-century essayists
Foreign ministers of Brazil
Chiefs of Staff of Brazil